Hagen is a masculine given name. Bearers of the name include:

 Hagen Danner (born 1998), American baseball player
 Hagen Kearney (born 1991), American snowboarder
 Hagen Kleinert (born 1941), German theoretical physicist
 Hagen Kunze (born 1973), German journalist, music critic and playwright
 Hagen Liebing (1961–2016), German bass player for the punk band Die Ärzte and journalist
 Hagen von Ortloff (born 1949), German television presenter
 Hagen Reeck (born 1959), German football manager and former player
 Hagen Reinhold (born 1978), German politician
 Hagen Rether (born 1969), Romanian-born German political cabaret artist and musician
 Hagen Schulte (born 1993), New Zealand rugby union player
 Hagen Schulze (1943–2014), German historian
 Hagen Stamm (born 1960), German former water polo player
 Hagen Stehr (born 1941), German-born Australian businessman

See also
 Hagan (given name)

Masculine given names